Refik Halit Karay (15 March 1888 – 18 July 1965) was a Turkish educator, writer and journalist.

Biography
He was born in Beylerbeyi, İstanbul, on 14 March 1888. His parents were Mehmed Halid Bey and Nefise Ruhsar Hanım. After studying at Galatasaray High School and Istanbul University Faculty of Law, he briefly served in the Ministry of Finance of the Ottoman Empire. 

During the Second Constitutional Era in 1908 he  resigned from his post and published a short-living newspaper. He also wrote in literary periodicals. Being an opponent of the Committee of Union and Progress he was exiled to several cities in Anatolia. After returning to İstanbul he wrote mainly on Anatolian life style. He was a pioneer in Anatolian based literature.  He attended the Freedom and Accord Party. During the reign of the Freedom and Accord Party he served as the teacher of Literature in Robert College and then the General Director of Turkish PTT. He published a periodical named Aydede and was one of the contributors of Kalem, a political satire magazine between 1908 and 1911. In addition, he served as the editor-in-chief of another political satire magazine, Cem, between 1910 and 1912.

Karay opposed the Turkish War of Independence and at the end of the war he escaped to Beirut and Aleppo. In 1938 after the amnesty law he returned to Turkey. He resumed his writing career and wrote a number of novels. He died on 18 July 1965. He was buried at Zincirlikuyu Cemetery in Istanbul.

Works

Novels
The following are his novels 
1920 İstanbul’ın İçyüzü (Lowdown of İstanbul)
1939 Yezidin Kızı (Daughter of Yezid)
1939 Çete (Gang)
1941 Sürgün (Exile)
1947 Anahtar (Key)
1950 Bu Bizim Hayatımız (This is Our Life)
1952 Nilgün
1953 Yeraltında Dünya Var (World Underground)
1953 Dişi Örümcek (Female spider)
1954 Bugünün Saraylısı (Royalty of today)
1954 2000 Yılın Sevgilisi (Sweetheart of the year 2000)
1955 İki Cisimli kadın (Two character woman)
1955 Kadınlar Tekkesi (Khanqah of Women)
1956 Karlı Dağdaki Ateş (Fire in the Snowy Mountain)
1957 Dört Yapraklı Yonca (Four leaf clover)
1965 Sonuncu Kadeh (Last chalice)
1971 Yerini Seven Fidan (Sapling which loved its place)
1980 Ekmek Elden Su Gölden (Life of Ease)
1980 Ayın Ondördü (Fourteenth of lunar month)
1981 Yüzen Bahçe (Floating garden)
(The last novels were published after his death)

Short story and humour
The following are his short story books:
1919 Memleket Hikayeleri (Stories from the homeland)
1940 Gurbet Hikayeleri (Stories from foreign lands)

The following are his humour books:
1915: Sakın Aldanma İnanma Kanma (Never be deceived, be fooled, believe)
1918: Kirpinin Dedikleri (What the hedgehog says)
1918: Agop Paşa’nın Hatıraları (The memoirs of Agap Paşa)
1922 Ay Peşinde (After the Moon)
1922 Tanıdıklarım (Friend)
1925 Guguklu Saat (Cuckoo clock)

References

Further reading
 Philliou, Christine M. Turkey: A Past Against History. Berkeley: University of California Press, 2021.

1888 births
1965 deaths
Burials at Zincirlikuyu Cemetery
Writers from Istanbul
Galatasaray High School alumni
Istanbul University Faculty of Law alumni
Civil servants from the Ottoman Empire
20th-century novelists
20th-century Turkish short story writers
Turkish magazine founders